"Adoro" is a song by Mexican singer-songwriter Armando Manzanero. The song was originally recorded and released by RCA in 1967, becoming one of Manzanero's best known songs. Momento magazine in 1969 reported that the song had already sold 250,000 copies and been recorded in about 60 versions in its first two years.

The lyrics begin "Adoro, la calle en que nos vimos, la noche, cuando nos conocimos ..."

Versions
After the initial run of "sixty versions" 1967-1969 noted by Momento magazine, the song has further been covered by artists including:
"I Adore You", English version sung by Andra Willis, with new English lyrics by Sunny Skylar 1971
"Ben böyleyim", turkish version by Ayten Alpman in 1975

Nini Rosso 1972
Salomé 1970
Adoro (Don't Tempt Me) by The Brass Ring Featuring Phil Bodner  1968
Franck Pourcel and his Orchestra - as title song of the album of the same name 1970, which went Gold in Japan.
Placido Domingo - as title song of the album of the same name 1982
Alejandro Sanz, on El Alma al Aire and as duet on Manzanero's Duetos album.
Noe Pro and The Semitones 
Italian singer Mina from the album Lochness vol. 1-2 1993
Ketil Bjørnstad and Svante Henryson on Night Song
Bronco on Por el Mundo (1992), #7 on the Billboard Hot Latin Tracks chart. Recipient of the BMI Latin Award in 1994. Also recorded for the live album Primera File (2017) featuring Julieta Venegas.

References

1967 songs
1969 singles
Spanish-language songs
Songs written by Armando Manzanero
RCA Victor singles
1992 singles
Grupo Bronco songs
Julieta Venegas songs